was a Japanese samurai and military commander of the Sengoku period. Hironaka clan was one of the most Important retainers of the Ōuchi clan for generations. Hironaka clan led the naval forces . Takakane was appointed as a shugodai of the Aki by Ōuchi Yoshitaka.

In the Battle of Miyajima occurred in 1555, Takakane judged it is not wise to attack Miyamija and advised Sue Harukata to attack Mōri Motonari directly but Harukata would not listen to Takakane's advice. Ōuchi force led by Sue Harukata was defeated soon by the Mōri clan but Takakane fought for three days and committed seppuku.

References

°

Samurai
1521 births
1555 deaths
Ōuchi clan
Suicides by seppuku
People from Yamaguchi Prefecture